Perona Gea Group is a Spanish transportation company primarily active in the oil and gas industry, founded in 1927 by Francisco Gea Perona.

The company transports refined petroleum products by road and distributes products for Repsol, Endesa and Gas Natural. The group also manages re-gasification plants.

References

Liquefied natural gas
Transport companies of Spain
Transport companies established in 1927
Spanish companies established in 1927
Energy companies established in 1927